"Prisoner (Love Theme from Eyes of Laura Mars)" is a song recorded by American singer Barbra Streisand in 1978 specifically for the film Eyes of Laura Mars.

Overview
The song was written by Karen Lawrence and John DeSautels, and produced by Gary Klein. It was first recorded by Lawrence and DeSautels's band L.A. Jets, released as a single in 1976 and charting at #86 on the Billboard Hot 100. Initially, it was assumed that Streisand would play the main role in the film Eyes of Laura Mars, but she refused the role, limiting herself to recording the song.

The song was released as a single in July 1978 along with a film's soundtracks, the film itself was released in early August. The song peaked at number 21 on the Billboard Hot 100 and at number 48 on the Adult Contemporary chart.

Charts

References

Film theme songs
1978 singles
Barbra Streisand songs
1978 songs
Song recordings produced by Gary Klein (producer)
Columbia Records singles
Songs written for films